The head of the Bodleian Library, the main library at the University of Oxford, is known as Bodley's Librarian: Sir Thomas Bodley, as founder, gave his name to both the institution and the position. Although there had been a university library at Oxford since about 1320, it had declined by the end of the 16th century. It was "denuded" of its books in 1550 in the time of King Edward VI when "superstitious books and images" that did not comply with the prevailing Anglican view were removed. Poor management and inadequate financial resources have also been blamed for the state of the library. In the words of one history of the university, "as a public institution, the Library had ceased to function." Bodley volunteered in 1598 to restore it; the university accepted the offer, and work began soon afterwards. The first librarian, Thomas James, was selected by Bodley in 1599. The Bodleian opened in 1602, and the university confirmed James in his post. Bodley wanted the librarian to be "some one that is noted and known for a diligent student, and in all his conversation to be trusty, active, and discrete, a graduate also and a linguist, not encumbered with marriage, nor with a benefice of Cure" (i.e. not a parish priest). James, however, was able to persuade Bodley to let him marry and become Rector of St Aldate's Church, Oxford.

In all, 25 people have served as Bodley's Librarian; their levels of diligence have varied over the years. Thomas Lockey (1660–65) was regarded by the 17th-century Oxford antiquarian Anthony Wood as not fit for the post, John Hudson (1701–19) has been described as "negligent if not incapable", and John Price (1768–1813) was accused by a contemporary scholar of "a regular and constant neglect of his duty". The current librarian, Richard Ovenden, was appointed in 2014.

Librarians

The librarians' affiliations with the colleges of the University of Oxford are given, marked with (A) for alumni and (F) for Fellows of the college.

References

Citations

Sources 
 General

 

 
Lists of people associated with the University of Oxford
Lists of librarians